Janno Jürgens (born on 18 May 1985 in Haapsalu) is an Estonian film director.

In 2012 he graduated from Baltic Film, Media, Arts and Communication School of Tallinn University.

Filmography
 "Mütomaan" (2005)
 "Ting" (2006)
 "Algolis" (2007)
 "Kuraditõestus" (2008)
 "Inimestest" (2008)
 "Tulepistmine" (2009)
 "Distants" (2012)
 "Meedik" (2014)
 "Final Cut" (2014)
 "Räägitakse, et tomatid armastavad rokkmuusikat" (2016)
 Rain (2020)

References

Living people
1985 births
Estonian film directors
People from Haapsalu